Porbandar  is a city in the Indian state of Gujarat, perhaps best known for being the birthplace of Mahatma Gandhi and Sudama. It is the administrative center of the Porbandar District and it was the former capital of the Porbandar princely state. As the birthplace of one of the most famous leaders of the world, Porbandar has a significant tourism-led infrastructure and economy. The area around Mahatma Gandhi's home has been renovated to make a temple of peace.

Porbandar's beach locally known as 'Chowpati' has a long, sandy expanse along the ocean. Construction activities to provide attractions and manage litter and facilities on Chowpati Beach started in around 2003. It has been furnished with well-arranged seating for tourists and commuters; there is a skating rink for children. The Chowpati ground has been used for the 'Janamastmi Fair', an annual festival. This place is well equipped with a circuit house and a range of hotels nearby for visitors.

Fisheries give a lot of employment to the city and to neighboring districts. Porbandar is also one of the last coasts remaining where the threatened marine mammal dugong can be found. Officials are working out for the conservation policies for the mammal.

Etymology 
As per the reference in Sudama Charitra of Skanda Purana, a religious text with plenty of geographical information, the present Porbandar city was names after Goddess Porav, and was located along the river banks of Asmavati.

History

Late  Harappan settlement (1600-1400 BCE)
Onshore explorations in and around Porbandar brought to light the remains of a Late Harappan settlement dating back to the 16th-14th centuries BCE. There is evidence to suggest that the Harappan legacy of maritime activity continued till the late Harappan period on the Saurashtra coast. The discovery of ancient jetties along the Porbandar creek signifies the importance of Porbandar as an active center of maritime activities in the past.

Indian theology views Porbandar as the birthplace of Sudama, a friend of Krishna. For this reason, it is also referred to as Sudaamapuri or Sudamapuri.

Princely Porbandar (1600 CE onwards) 

Porbandar was the seat of the eponymous princely state in British India. Later the state belonged to the Jethwa clan of Rajputs and had been established in the area since at least the mid-16th century. The state was subordinate to the Mughal governor of Gujarat until being overrun by the Marathas in the latter half of the 18th century. After, they came under the authority of the Gaekwad court at Baroda and eventually of the Peshwa.

British influence
In common with the other states of Kathiawar, the state first came into the ambit of British influence in 1807, when the HEIC guaranteed security in the area in lieu of a fixed annual tribute to be paid to the Peshwa and the Gaekwad. In 1817, the Peshwa ceded his share to the HEIC; in 1820, the Gaekwad agreed to have the HIEC collect his due tributes in Kathiawar and remit the same to his treasury.

It enjoyed a revenue of Rs. 21,00,000/-. By 1947, the rulers held the style of "Highness" and the title of "Maharaj Rana Sahib". They were entitled to a salute of 13 guns as a hereditary distinction.

After Independence
Upon the Independence of India in 1947, the state was annexed into the dominion of India. It was merged with the 'United State of Kathiawar', effective 15 February 1948 and eventually came to form part of the present-day state of Gujarat. The last King of Porbandar was Natwarsinhji Bhavsinhji Maharaj.

Geography 
It has an average elevation of 1 metre (3 ft).

Climate 
Like most of Gujarat, Porbandar has a hot semi-arid climate (Köppen BSh) with three distinct seasons: the “cool” from October to March, the “hot” in April, May and early June, and the monsoonal “wet” from mid-June to September.

Almost no rain falls outside the monsoon season, except for a very few late-season tropical cyclones.

With a coefficient of variation exceeding fifty percent and an expectation of only 41 percent of mean annual rainfall in the driest year in ten, the Porbandar region is among the most variable in the world—comparable to northern Australia, the Brazilian sertão and the Kiribatese Line Islands.

An illustration of Porbandar's extremely variable rainfall can be seen from 1899 to 1905 when seven successive years produced annual falls of:
  in 1899
  in 1900
  in 1901
  in 1902
  in 1903
  in 1904 and
  in 1905

Porbandar, owing to its coastal location, is the least hot of all major cities in Gujarat: Average high temperatures do not reach  in any month.

Demographics 

 India census, Porbandar (City and urban outgrowth) had a population of 152,760. Males constituted 51.4% of the population and females 48.6%. Porbandar has an average literacy rate of 86.46%, higher than the national average of 74.04%: male literacy is 91.69%, and female literacy is 80.92%. In Porbandar, 9.11% of the population is under 6 years of age.

According to the Census in 2011, the population of Porbander contracted 3.85% in 2011. i.e. the growth rate was negative. The sex ration of the city was 943 in 2011.

Government and politics 
Porbandar City is governed by a municipal council. The municipality is responsible for supply of water to the city using Narmada as the main source of water supply. The municipality supplies around 14 MLD everyday to the city. As per records available from 2008, the city had a coverage of 39% in terms of water supply connections though the coverage of distribution system was reported as 80%. As per another assessment in the year 2016, Porbandar ranked the lowest in terms the volume of water supplied per capita at 59 lpcd (liters per capita per day) as compared to Gandhinagar which ranked the highest at 245 lpcd.  Municipality is also responsible for waste management in the city and generates about 66 tonnes per day of waste.

The current member of Parliament is Rameshbhai Dhaduk. The current member of the Gujarat Legislative Assembly is Babu Bokhiria.

Culture

Tourist attractions 

The best time to visit is October to March.
 Kirti Mandir, It is located at the Main bazaar, Manek Chowk. Timings 7:30 AM to 7:00 PM Everyday. Website : https://kirtimandirpbr.org/
 Rana Bapu's Mahal is located nearby Chowpati
 Bharat Mandir (A permanent exhibition of culture, history and geometry about India. It was established by Shri Nanjibhai Kalidas Mehta)
 Tara Mandir (one of the oldest planetariums of India)
 Ram Krishna Mission (Swami Vivekananda stayed here for four months)
 Shree Sudama ji Mandir: One of the few temples built in India in his name
 Shree Hari Mandir or Sandipani temple (handled by Ramesh Oza): a massive temple complex
 The Huzoor Palace, Daria Raj Mahal Palace, Darbargadh and the Sartanji Choro
 Chowpati beach: one of the cleanest in coastal Gujarat
 Porbandar Bird Sanctuary (birds like teals, fowls, flamingos, ibis, curlews can be seen)
 Barda Hills Wildlife Sanctuary (about 15 km from Porbandar, ideal for trekking)
 Bileshwara Shiva temple (built in the seventh century)
 Khimeshwar Mahadev Temple (Kuchchdi) (1600-year-old temple as per the Archaeological Survey of India)
 Jamvant cave (15 km away at Ranavav town) (historical place from the time of Ramayan)
 Ghumli (37 km from the city, Capital of Jethwa kingdom till 1313, listed by Archaeological Survey of India)
 Porbandar has many wetlands ideal for birdwatching.
 Janmashtami Mela (5 days), celebrated in the month of Shraavana as per Hindu calendar. There are rides, food, and other attractions.
 Asmavati riverfront, spread across the area of 94,000 sq m

Notable people 
 Mahatma Gandhi - considered as "The father of the Nation" was born here
 Kasturba Gandhi - wife of Mahatma Gandhi
 Nanji Kalidas Mehta - businessman and philanthropist
 Dr. Savitaben Nanji Kalidas Mehta - Educationist and Manipuri dancer
 Nanabhai Bhatt - film director and producer
 Jaydev Unadkat - Indian cricket player
 Dilip Joshi - actor (playing lead role as Jethalal Gada in Taarak Mehta Ka Ooltah Chashmah)
 Sudama - (also known as Kuchela) friend of Krishna
 Ajay Lalcheta- Oman cricket team Ex-captain  & player

Transport 

The local transportation is auto rickshaw. Sudama Chowk is the main hub of auto rickshaw and private taxis.

Porbandar is well-connected by road, rail and air to cities across the country.

Port
Porbandar is an ancient port city. At present it has an all-weather port, with direct berthing facilities up to 50,000 DWT ships.

Road

The city is connected through National Highway 27, connecting to Rajkot and Ahmedabad. National Highway 8E Ext (also known as State Highway 6) connects to Jamnagar, Dwarka in the north and Veraval, Bhavnagar in the south.

Major public transport is covered by the private and government buses.

Many private coaches are available daily to Rajkot, Dwarka, Veraval, Junagadh, Ahmedabad, Jamnagar, Vadodra, Surat, and Mumbai.

Large number of S.T. buses (State Transport Corporation operated by government) are available to multiple destinations including major cities of the state, small villages and towns.

From Narsang Tekri, you can catch luxurious air-conditioned private buses for Rajkot and Ahmedabad. The booking is available on the internet.

Rail
Porbandar railway station connects Porbandar with major cities of state and the country. There are daily trains to Rajkot (via Jamnagar, Bhanwad and Upleta, Dhoraji, Gondal as well), Somnath (via Junagadh) and Mumbai (via Ahmedabad, Vadodra and Surat). There are also trains to Delhi, Muzaffarpur and Howrah connecting to major cities of Rajasthan, Uttar Pradesh, Vidarbha and West Bengal. A weekly train service connects Kochuveli, Thiruvananthapuram (Kerala) and Secunderabad (Hyderabad) with Porbandar via Mangalore, Calicut, Kochi and Quilon(Kollam).

Airport
From 17-Aug-2022 no flights are operational. Previously
Porbandar Airport Mumbai-Porbandar & Porbandar - Delhi flight by SpiceJet was operational.

Ahmedabad-Porbandar to and fro flight by TruJet was operational as well.

Sports 
 Duleep School of Cricket Ground is one of two cricket grounds in Porbandar. The ground is also the home ground of Saurashtra cricket team. It hosted six cricket matches from 1968 to 1986 before falling of the record. The ground is named after great Indian cricketer and Prince of Nawanagar Kumar Shri Duleepsinhji.
 Natwarsinhji Cricket Club Ground is one of two cricket grounds in Porbandar. It hosted a Ranji Trophy match in October 1960 between Saurashtra cricket team and Maharashtra cricket team. The Maharashtra team won by 10 wickets as the match had a low scores with Saurashtra scored 94 & 139 and Maharashtra scored 187 and 47/0. It was scheduled for three days but was completed in two. This was only cricket played on the ground.
 Indian cricketer Jaydev Unadkat was born in Porbandar.

References

Sources
 for more details on Porbandar
 Jayesh Hinglajiya known as Modern Gandhi Sets World Record to change Body Colors
 Hemant Sharma, Artist and Photographer from Porbandar set World Record
 Genealogy of the ruling chiefs of Porbandar
 Application of geological and geophysical methods in marine archaeology and underwater explorations
 Porbandar district

External links 

 

 
Port cities in India
Populated coastal places in India
Ports and harbours of Gujarat
Former capital cities in India